Events from the year 1893 in China.

Incumbents
Guangxu Emperor (19th year)

Events
November 29 - establishment of Wuhan University

Births
January 27 - Soong Ching-ling, wife of Sun Yat-sen
March 18 - Bai Chongxi
June 15 - Zhang Shenfu
November 26 - Yang Hucheng
December 26 - Mao Zedong
Date unknown
Van Chu-Lin, New Zealand homemaker and storekeeper (d. 1946)

References

 
Years of the 19th century in China